Gray's Anatomy is a classic human anatomy textbook, first edition (1858) by Henry Gray and Henry Carter.

Gray's Anatomy may refer to:

Gray's Anatomy (film), 1996 film written by Spalding Gray
Gray's Anatomy: Selected Writings, a 2009 book by John N. Gray

See also 
Grey's Anatomy, American television series